Han Song-chol (born 10 July 1977) is a North Korean former footballer. He represented North Korea on at least thirty-one occasions between 2002 and 2008.

Career statistics

International

References

1977 births
Living people
North Korean footballers
North Korea international footballers
Association football defenders